Francisca del Carmen González Campos (born 20 July 1993) is a Salvadoran footballer who plays as a midfielder for CD FAS and the El Salvador women's national team.

Club career
González has played for CD FAS in El Salvador.

International goals
Scores and results list El Salvador's goal tally first.

See also
List of El Salvador women's international footballers

References

1993 births
Living people
Salvadoran women's footballers
Women's association football midfielders
El Salvador women's international footballers